Nituria  (also spelled Neturia) is a village, with a police station, in the Neturia CD block in the Raghunathpur subdivision of the Purulia district in West Bengal, India.

Geography

Location

Area overview
Purulia district forms the lowest step of the Chota Nagpur Plateau. The general scenario is undulating land with scattered hills. Raghunathpur subdivision occupies the northern part of the district. 83.80% of the population of the subdivision  lives in rural areas. However, there are pockets of urbanization and 16.20% of the population lives in urban areas. There are 14 census towns in the subdivision. It is presented in the map given alongside. There is a coal mining area around Parbelia and two thermal power plants are there – the 500 MW Santaldih Thermal Power Station and the 1200 MW Raghunathpur Thermal Power Station. The subdivision has a rich heritage of old temples, some of them belonging to the 11th century or earlier. The Banda Deul is a monument of national importance. The comparatively more recent in historical terms, Panchkot Raj has interesting and intriguing remains in the area.

Note: The map alongside presents some of the notable locations in the subdivision. All places marked in the map are linked in the larger full screen map.

Demographics
According to the 2011 Census of India Nituria had a total population of 1,144 of which 580 (51%) were males and 564 (49%) were females. There were 149 persons in the age range of 0–6 years. The total number of literate persons in Nituria was 689 (69.25% of the population over 6 years).

Civic administration

Police station
Neturia police station has jurisdiction over the Neturia CD block. The area covered is 203.65 km2 and the population covered is 101,922.

Education
Panchakot Mahavidyalaya was established in 2001 at Sarbari.

Garh Panchakot International School is an English-medium coeducational institution, with a plan to extend classes to the higher secondary level of CBSE. It has hostel facilities. It is located at Sarbari morh, PO & PS Nituria.

Bhamuria S.M. High School is a Bengali-medium co-educational institution established in 1965. It has facilities for teaching from class V to class XII.

Neturia Girls School is a Bengali-medium girls only higher secondary school established in 1988.

Culture
Garh Panchkot is a ruined 16th century fort/ palace of the Panchkot Raj at the foot of the Panchet Hill.

Achkoda, located in this block, showcases aatchala-style temples with terracotta work on the walls.  It “seems to be at least five centuries old. Its panels are smaller in size and some of them depict tribal life.”

Healthcare
Harmadih Rural Hospital, with 30 beds at Harmadih, is the major government medical facility in the Neturia CD block.

References

Villages in Purulia district